Daniel Bensaïd (25 March 1946 – 12 January 2010) was a philosopher and a leader of the Trotskyist movement in France. He became a leading figure in the student revolt of 1968, while studying at the University of Paris X: Nanterre.

Life and career 
Bensaïd was born in Toulouse, France, to a father who was a Sephardic Jew from Algeria, and who had moved from Oran, where he met Bensaïd's mother, to Vichy Toulouse. In response to the 8 February 1962 Charonne massacre of Algerians in Paris, Bensaïd joined the Union of Communist Students. Irritated by the party orthodoxy he swiftly became part of a left opposition within the union, and was among the dissidents expelled from the party in 1966.

In 1966, Bensaïd began studying at the École normale supérieure de Saint-Cloud, where he helped found the Jeunesse Communiste Révolutionnaire, which became the Ligue Communiste Révolutionnaire (LCR). With Daniel Cohn-Bendit he helped to found the Mouvement du 22 Mars (Movement of 22 March), which was involved in the protests of May 1968 in France.

Bensaïd became a leading theorist of the LCR and the United Secretariat of the Fourth International, and a professor of philosophy at the University of Paris-VIII. He was also a Fellow at the International Institute for Research and Education. Upon his death, Tariq Ali described him as "France's leading Marxist public intellectual, much in demand on talkshows and writing essays and reviews in Le Monde and Libération." Bensaïd was known for his studies of Walter Benjamin and Karl Marx, and a recent analysis of French postmodernism.

He died of cancer on 12 January 2010 at the age of 63, arising from the side effects of drugs used to treat AIDS, which he had had for the previous 16 years.

Criticism and debate 
Bensaïd and the current of Trotskyism represented by the Unified Secretariat of the Fourth International have come under attack from more orthodox Trotskyists for the strategy they have advanced of entering the "new social movements"; in particular, for seeing reform and revolution as a false dichotomy, and proposing the formation of "broad parties," rather than forming parties of the traditional Leninist type. In one such critique, Luke Cooper criticised Bensaïd for arguing that—in certain specific circumstances—it maybe permissible to enter a capitalist government, and seek to use the existing state as an instrument of revolutionary transformation. Bensaïd also debated revolutionary strategy with other Fourth International members, and the British Socialist Workers Party's International Secretary Alex Callinicos.

Bibliography 
 with Henri Weber : Mai 1968: Une répétition générale (François Maspero, 1968, online edition)
 La revolution et le pouvoir (Penser, 1976)
 "In Memory of a Rebel". Telos 44, Summer 1980.
 Walter Benjamin: sentinelle messianique (Plon, 1990)
 La discordance des temps: essais sur les crises, les classes, l'histoire (Editions de la Passion, 1995)
 Marx l'intempestif: Grandeurs et misères d'une aventure critique (Fayard, 1995); English translation: A Marx for Our Times: Adventures and Misadventures of a Critique (Verso, 2002) 
 Le pari mélancolique (Fayard, 1997)
 Qui est le juge? (Fayard, 1999)
 Contes et légendes de la guerre éthique (Textuel, 1999)
 Eloge de la résistance à l'air du temps (Textuel, 1999)
 Le sourire du spectre (Michalon, 2000)
 Les irréductibles (Textuel, 2001)
 Une lente impatience (Stock, 2004) - his autobiography; English translation: An Impatient Life: A Memoir (Verso, 2014) 
 Fragments mécréants. Mythes identitaires et république imaginaire (2005)

References

External links 
 Daniel Bensaïd website - Multilingual website with articles, books, audio and video recordings by and of Daniel Bensaïd
 Daniel Bensaïd Archive at marxists.org
 All Daniel Bensaïd's articles (french language) on La Brèche Numérique
 Daniel Bensaïd's articles in International Viewpoint
 
 Tariq Ali, "Daniel Bensaïd obituary", The Guardian, 14 January 2010
 Alex Callinicos, "Daniel Bensaid Obituary", SWP Online, 12 January 2010

1946 births
2010 deaths
Deaths from cancer in France
AIDS-related deaths in France
Burials at Père Lachaise Cemetery
Critics of postmodernism
ENS Fontenay-Saint-Cloud-Lyon alumni
20th-century French Sephardi Jews
French male writers
French Marxists
French people of Algerian-Jewish descent
20th-century French philosophers
Atheist philosophers
Jewish atheists
Jewish philosophers
Jewish socialists
Marxist theorists
Marxist writers
May 1968 events in France
New Anticapitalist Party politicians
Politicians from Toulouse
Revolutionary Communist League (France) politicians
Academic staff of Paris 8 University Vincennes-Saint-Denis